Long Thành, tỉnh Đồng Nai may refer to several places in Vietnam, including:

Long Thành
Long Thành District, a rural district of Đồng Nai Province
Long Thành (township in Đồng Nai), a township and capital of Long Thành District
Long Thành, Trà Vinh, a township and capital of Duyên Hải District
Long Thành, Nghệ An, a rural commune of Yên Thành District

Long Thạnh
Long Thạnh, An Giang, a ward of Tân Châu, An Giang
Long Thạnh, Bạc Liêu, a commune of Vĩnh Lợi District
Long Thạnh, Hậu Giang, a commune of Phụng Hiệp District
Long Thạnh, Kiên Giang, a commune of Giồng Riềng District
Long Thạnh, Long An, a commune of Thủ Thừa District